Zauralie Kurgan (Хоккейный клуб «Зауралье» Курган) is an ice hockey team in Kurgan, Kurgan Oblast, Russia. They play in the VHL, the second level of Russian ice hockey.

History
The club was founded in 1994 as a merger between clubs Mostovik (Bridge Worker) and Turbinka (Turbine) as Mostovik-Turbinka Kurgan later becoming a farm club of Rubin Tyumen. It got its current name Zauralie (Trans-Ural) since the 2003–04 season. They became affiliated with Sibir Novosibirsk of the Kontinental Hockey League in 2008, Avangard Omsk in 2012 and Metallurg Novokuznetsk in 2014. With the demotion of Novokuznetsk, Kurgan then entered into an agreement to be the primary affiliate to Metallurg Magnitogorsk of the KHL in 2017.

The club have junior farm-club Yunior Kurgan, are played in MHL-B, second level of junior ice hockey league in Russia.

Honors

National 
 Vysshaya Liga (RUS-2)
  Third place (1): 2003/2004
 Pervaya Liga (RUS-3)
  Champion (1): 2000/2001

Stadium 
 Paryshev Sports Palace

Capacity: 2500

Team Colors

Front Office and Coaches 
Director
 Viktor Prozorov
General manager
 Alexey Chechin
Head coach
 Mikhail Zvyagin
Assistant coach
 Rashit Galimzhanov
 Vyacheslav Sedov

Roster

Head coaches 
Sergei Gersonsky (2001-2002)

Mikhail Malko (2002-2006)

Oleg Gushchin (2006-2008)

Igor Zhilinsky (2008-2010)

Vladimir Shikhanov (2010-2013)

Igor Velker (2013)

Sergei Dushkin (2013-2015)

Albert Loginov (2015-2016)

Mikhail Zvyagin (since 2016)

References

External links
 Official site

 
Ice hockey teams in Russia
Ice hockey clubs established in 1961
Sport in Kurgan, Kurgan Oblast
1961 establishments in Russia